Hypericum cerastioides is a species of perennial flowering plant in the St. John's wort family, Hypericaceae. It is the only species in the section Hypericum sect. Campylopus.

It is sometimes misspelled as Hypericum cerastoides.

Distribution and habitat
Hypericum cerastioides is found in southern Bulgaria, northeastern Greece, and northwestern Turkey. Its habitat includes meadows, rocky areas, and pine-beech woodlands on siliceous soils.

References

cerastioides